This is a list of characters in the animated television series 101 Dalmatian Street.

Dalmatian family

The Dalmatian family consists of 101 Dalmatians (2 parents and 99 puppies), as the title of the series suggests. They all live at the titular 101 Dalmatian Street in Camden Town, London, UK.

Main siblings
Due to the large number of puppies in the family, the series focuses on 18 of the siblings.
Dylan (voiced by Josh Brener) is 12 years old in dog years. Dylan is a descendant of Pongo and Perdita, and the eldest male Dalmatian puppy. He is a pedantic control freak who dreams of being the first dog on Mars. Unlike Dolly and other puppies, Dylan shows more responsibility and considers himself the leader of the Dalmatian pups. However, he can also be pompous, neurotic and gullible, sometimes letting his wild imagination get the better of him. He is very strict about the pups' safety. He has a severe cat allergy.
Dolly (voiced by Michaela Dietz) is 12 years old in dog years. She is also a descendant of Pongo and Perdita, and is the eldest female Dalmatian puppy. She is a rebellious tomboy who tends to have many outlandish ideas that end up causing trouble. Dolly is more carefree, outgoing, and adventurous than Dylan, but also impulsive and irresponsible. Still, she tries to be a good helper and is ultimately loyal to the rest of her family, and, unlike her brother, is shown to be level-headed and rational in times of crisis. She likes to perform tricks on her skateboard and has a crush on a Husky named Hansel, but in "A Summer to Remember" she's in love with Spike.
Dante (voiced by Kyle Soller) is a gloomy goth who has black fur with white and purple spots. He sometimes panics due to his theories about the end of the world [or cows]. His predictions never come true, unless someone is helping him.
D.J. (voiced by Maxwell Apple) is a music lover, and he can play any instrument.
Dimitri 1, 2, and 3 (voiced by Rocco Wright) are a trio of brothers who love to cause trouble. They do not like cats.
Dawkins (voiced by Rhys-Issac Jones) is a science nerd, and Dylan's unappreciated sidekick. Aside from Dylan and Dolly, he appears to be the pup with the most common sense.
Da Vinci (voiced by Akiya Henry) is an artist with an odd vision, much like the Renaissance artist she is named after.
Deepak (voiced by Nikhil Parmar) is a yin-yang colored Buddhist-like cat monk who tries hard to stay chill. He loves cats and wants to be a cat. He is able to keep the pups calm whenever they are in a panicking state.
Delgado (voiced by Jack Binstead) is a puppy in a doggy wheelchair. He has a charismatic personality. He likes racing and sports. He is mainly seen playing with his sister Dolly.
Dizzy and Dee Dee (voiced by Florrie Wilkinson and Nefeli Karakosta respectively) are a pair of mischievous sister puppies and Dolly's sidekicks. They tend to care the most about Dolly and Dylan.
Diesel (voiced by Bert Davis) is a silly dirty unibrow puppy obsessed with digging tunnels in the dirt and or walls. He has a keen sense of smell.
Destiny, Dallas, and Déjà Vu (voiced by Lauren Donzis, and Abigail Zoe Lewis) are a trio of over-the-top triplets. They are divas who have a job acting in commercials together. They often talk in unison.
Dorothy (voiced by Margot Powell) is the youngest of the family. She doesn't have any spots on her fur due to her young age. She often gets into mischief, resulting in Dylan having to help her.

Parents
Doug (voiced by Rhashan Stone) is Delilah's husband and a firefighter dog for the London Fire Brigade. He is the father of Dolly, Dylan and the pups. He loves his puppies with all his heart, and has a very laid-back, light-hearted personality.
Delilah (voiced by Ella Kenion) is Doug's wife and a nursing dog at the NHS. She is the mother of Dylan, Dolly and the pups. She is a direct descendant of Pongo and Perdita by a few generations.

Other siblings
The other puppies in the family are recurring background characters. They do not and sometimes appear as often, and don’t  receive as much screen time as the main characters. The names of the other 81 siblings were all revealed in "In the House", the full version of a song from the official soundtrack of the series. "In The House" recalls all members of the Dalmatian family. Most of them look similar to each other, with the main difference being the colors of their collars. They are all older than Dorothy.

They are:

 Desmond
 Delphie
 Dafydd
 Dinlo
 Donburi
 Declan
 Diana
 Ditto
 Denzel
 Dapple
 Domino
 Darby
 Darcy
 Dandy
 Donut
 Dodger
 Dara
 Demi
 Dimple
 Denim
 Dean
 Daoud
 Dingo
 Dieter
 Dijon
 Doreen
 Duffy
 Dobie
 Diamond
 Derek
 Dusty
 Dane
 Delta
 Dilma
 Dominique
 Duke
 Dechang
 Debbie-May
 Debbie-Lou
 Debbie-Lee
 Denver
 Devon
 Duck
 Dutch
 Duchess
 Drama
 Drew
 Dinga
 Donny
 Duncan
 Dax
 Dibs
 Disco
 Dixie
 Dubaku
 Diego
 Daphne
 Divya
 Doris
 Dvorak
 Dolce Vita
 Dalmar
 Drake
 Dupont
 Deneesha
 December
 Dai-ichi
 Donna-Maria
 Dionne
 Dulcinea
 Dalston
 Deuce
 Daley
 Dorset
 Desiree
 Darius
 Damian
 Durian
 Dani
 Dumpling
 Dakota

Recurring

Animals
Fergus (voiced by Conor MacNeill) is a sneaky and cunning red fox, and Dylan's best friend. Fergus originated from Ireland. Although it is not said where in Ireland he is from, it is believed that he came from Northern Ireland due to his Ulster accent.
Sid (voiced by Doc Brown) is a cheeky trickster squirrel who is obsessed with nuts. He lives in the forest with Fergus and Big Fee.
Big Fee (voiced by Aimee-Ffion Edwards) is a gothic rat who hangs out with Sid and Fergus.
Portia Poodle (voiced by Paloma Faith) is the coolest poodle pup in Camden Town. She is dark, intense, and has lots of attitude. Portia Poodle is Dylan's former girlfriend, though Dylan still loves her.
Spencer Sausage Dog (voiced by Doc Brown) is a snarky and snooty dachshund who is Portia's sidekick and close friend.
Pearl (voiced by Tameka Empson) is a female police horse who takes her job as a police horse seriously.

Prunella Pug (voiced by Bethan Wright) is a tan pug who wears a black collar with a pink flower on it. She is one of Clarissa's sidekicks and close friends.
Constantin (voiced by Rufus Jones) is a cat that lives next door to the Dalmatians. He teaches yoga and is Deepak's mentor.
Hansel (voiced by Rasmus Hardiker) is a handsome Siberian Husky who is Dolly's love interest. He loves poems and yoga. He speaks with a Polish accent.

Roxy (voiced by Akiya Henry) is a large Rottweiler who is Dolly's best friend. Despite her intimidating size, she is actually very kind. She has a crush on Dylan, but Dylan rejects her.

Arabella (voiced by Aimee-Ffion Edwards) is a Lhasa Apso and one of Clarissa's sidekicks and close friends.
Snowball (voiced by Daniela Denby-Ashe) is a Pomeranian that is a friend of Dolly and Roxy. She speaks with a Slavic accent (in the short Disco Pups, she used the word nie; in Polish and Slovakian this means no).
Spike (voiced by Olly Murs) is a young Dobermann from the countryside who loves to swing. Dolly has a crush on him.
Summer (voiced by Aimee-Ffion Edwards) is a young Border Collie from Cornwall. She is Dylan's love interest.

Humans
Mr. Fuzzy (voiced by Matt Wilkinson) is a clumsy and easygoing man who lives in London who was brought to the 101 Dalmatian Street house by Dizzy and Dee Dee as Dylan's pet. He was supposed to help the dogs in cleaning the house, but eventually the Dalmatians decided that they could not keep him. Later, he met a girl and fell in love with her; now he sometimes appears as a minor or background character.

Doctor Dave (voiced by Stephen Mangan) is the man Delilah works with at the NHS Hospital. He knows they live alone.

Antagonists

Animals
Clarissa (voiced by Harriet Carmichael) is a very mean-spirited, spoiled rotten Corgi who is the next-door neighbor to the Dalmatians. She lives with her human, who tends to act like a puppy. She hates the Dalmatian pups for ruining her peaceful moments. She does everything she can to make their lives miserable, while claiming to be a proper lady.
Bessie (voiced by Miriam Margolyes) is smart and devious, but appears to be a harmless, sweet, and simple local.
Cuddles is the pet and sidekick of Hunter De Vil. Hunter later disowns Cuddles when he betrays him in the episode "The De Vil Wears Puppies".

Humans
Cruella De Vil (voiced by Michelle Gomez) is the main antagonist of 101 Dalmatian Street and the entire 101 Dalmatians franchise. Her voice is first heard at the end of "A Date with Destiny… Dallas and Déjà Vu", and a number of later episodes featured her voice as well. Her first partial appearance is at the end of "Better The De Vil You Know", but later on her full appearance is finally seen in "The De Vil Wears Puppies". In it, she invades the house and scares all the puppies, presumably looking to capture them as she attempted with their ancestors. However, due to her cruel behavior and betrayal of Hunter, Hunter betrays Cruella and helps the Dalmatian family. De Vil is eventually arrested at the end of the episode for pet cruelty. Despite Cruella nearly being 100 in 2019, the present time in the show, she still looks fit and agile. She has become bald and wears a wig. Instead of her cigarette holder, she uses a perfume that hides her signs of aging with a layer of makeup.
Hunter De Vil (voiced by Joshua LeClair) is a photographer, and Cruella de Vil's great-nephew. While Hunter initially appears as a background character, he gains a prominent role in "The Nose Job", in which he is revealed to be responsible for the recent vandalism at the park and congratulates his cat for finding the Dalmatian family. Like Cruella, he has an obsession with Dalmatians. In "London, We Have a Problem", he played a bigger role when he befriended Dylan in having a common love for outer space. Hunter kidnapped Dorothy so Dylan could find her and tricked him into leading him to their house. He used a large vacuum to trap the 97 puppies and put them in a shipping container to take them to Switzerland, but he was overpowered by Dylan and Dolly who saved the puppies by saying the trigger word "dinner". Hunter himself was then locked in the container and went to Switzerland. He became a dog version of himself, so Dylan was able to trick him. He later finds out that Cruella was using him, and she never loved him. He was unaware that she was planning to kill the puppies for her coat. As he was being thrown into the same container with all the other puppies, he told them how he suffered for 6-months and that Cruella never called once. Hunter described how alone he was, resulting in the puppies feeling sympathy for him. He later turns against Cruella and helps save all the other puppies.

References

101 Dalmatian Street
101 Dalmatian Street
101 Dalmatian Street
101 Dalmatians